Banbaşı (also, Bambashi, Banbashi, and Banbashy) is a village and municipality in the Masally Rayon of Azerbaijan.  It has a population of 2,290.

References 

Populated places in Masally District